Dimitrios Makris (1772–1841) was a Greek klepht and armatolos who was one of the most powerful chieftains in West Central Greece. He joined the Filiki Eteria and became a revolutionary during the Greek War of Independence.

Early life

Dimitrios Makris was born in 1772 in Gavalou, Evrytania. His father was Evangelos Makris, who had taken part in the Greek revolt in 1770. After his death Dimitrios became Captain in the district of Zyghos.

Greek War of Independence

He was originally a klepht under Captain Georgios Sfaltos, and took over command of his band after Sfaltos' death. He was appointed an armatolos at Zygos, and never collaborated with Ali Pasha of Janina. He acquired much wealth by plundering the Turks at Vrachori. He was initiated into the Filiki Eteria just before the revolution was launched in Western Greece on May 5, 1821. He participated as a representative of Zygos in the Assembly of Western Continental Greece in 1821.

He participated in many battles against the Ottoman Turks including the Third Siege of Missolonghi. During the siege Dimitrios Makris married Eupraxia, daughter of the city's notable Samos Razi-Kotsikas. He later fought in Agrinio and Aitoliko and with the collaboration of Georgios Karaiskakis troops attacked and repulsed a body of Albanians. Soon after he joined the troops of Alexandros Mavrokordatos. In 1823 he was named a general in the rebel army. After the establishment of the Greek kingdom Makris refrained from accepting any political and military honors. He returned to his home town, where he eventually died in 1841.

Historical relics
Numerous weapons of Dimitros Makris are preserved in the City Hall of Missolonghi including the sword which he used in the Exodus of Missolonghi, which belonged to his ancestral family and dates back to the old fighters of 1732. The museum also hold his famous silver rifle, the Liaros.

See also 
 Alexandros Mavrokordatos

References

1772 births
1841 deaths
People from Aetolia-Acarnania
Greek generals
Greek revolutionaries
Greek military leaders of the Greek War of Independence
18th-century Greek people
19th-century Greek military personnel
Members of the Royal Phalanx